Minburn may refer to:
County of Minburn No. 27, a municipal district in Alberta, Canada
Minburn, Alberta, a hamlet in Canada
Minburn, Iowa, a city in the United States